Vera Anatolyevna Pavlova (born 1963) is a Russian poet.

Biography
Vera Pavlova was born in Moscow, 1963. She studied at the Oktyabryskaya Revolyutsiya Music College and only started publishing after graduation. She graduated from the Gnessin Academy, specializing in the history of music.

She is the author of twenty collections of poetry, four opera libretti, and lyrics to two cantatas. Her works have been translated into twenty five languages. Her work has been published in The New Yorker.

References

External links
Bibliography of poetry in English translation
Interview in Modern Poetry in Translation
Documentary by Red Palette Pictures

1963 births
Living people
Russian women poets
Writers from Moscow
20th-century Russian women writers
20th-century Russian poets
21st-century Russian women writers
21st-century Russian poets
Russian opera librettists
Women opera librettists